Mehr is a city in Gachi Rural District, Gachi District, Malekshahi County, Ilam Province, Iran. At the 2006 census, its population was 1,238, in 262 families. The village is populated by Kurds.

References 

Populated places in Malekshahi County
Cities in Ilam Province
Kurdish settlements in Ilam Province